Katja Wolf (born 7 March 1976 in Erfurt) is a German politician (The Left). She was a representative in the Landtag of Thuringia from 1999 to 2012 and since 1 July 2012 has been the mayor of the city of Eisenach in Thuringia.

Life 
After completing her Abitur in 1994 at the Heinrich-Hertz-Gymnasium in Erfurt, Wolf studied social work at the University of Applied Sciences Erfurt and graduated with a diploma in 1999.  From January to August 1999 she worked as a researcher for the Landtag of Thuringia. In the 1999 Thuringian state election, she was herself elected to the Landtag and became chair of the Equal Opportunities Committee (Gleichstellungsausschuss).  She has been a member of the Eisenach city council since 2004.

In the 2009 Thuringian state election, Wolf succeeded in winning the direct mandate in the constituency of Wartburgkreis II - Eisenach.

For the 2012 Thuringian municipal elections, Wolf stood as a candidate for mayor of the city of Eisenach. On 6 May 2012, she was elected mayor with 51.6% of the vote. On 15 June 2015, a recall petition filed by the National Democratic Party of Germany (NPD) in city council also attracted considerable attention beyond the region when 16 out of 34 city councillors voted in favour of the motion in secret ballot, although the NPD had only three seats.

Wolf has no religious affiliation and is married with two children.

Links 

 Oberbürgermeisterin Katja Wolf - Profile from the City of Eisenach (in German)
 Official website of Katja Wolf (German)

References 

Members of the Landtag of Thuringia
Mayors of places in Thuringia
The Left (Germany) politicians
Party of Democratic Socialism (Germany) politicians
1976 births
Living people